General Sir Frank Walter Messervy,  (9 December 1893 – 2 February 1974) was a British Indian Army officer in the First and Second World Wars. Following its independence, he was the first Commander-in-Chief of the Pakistan Army (15 August 1947 – 10 February 1948). Previously, he had served as General Officer Commanding-in-Chief Northern Command, India in 1946 and 1947.

Personal
Messervy was born in 1893 in Trinidad the oldest child of Walter John Messervy (born in Jersey in the English Channel), a bank manager in the colony (and later England) and his wife Myra Naida de Boissiere from Trinidad.

Early career
Sent to England from Trinidad, he was initially educated at Eton College and the Royal Military College, Sandhurst and was commissioned into the Indian Army in 1913 and in 1914 joined 9th Hodson's Horse. which later became part of the 4th Duke of Cambridge's Own Hodson's Horse. He would see action in the First World War in France, Palestine and Syria from 1914 to 1918. He later served in Kurdistan in 1919.

After attending the Staff College, Camberley, from 1925−1926, Messervy was appointed as an instructor at the Staff College, Quetta from 1932 to 1936. He was made Commanding Officer (CO) of the 13th Duke of Connaught's's Own Lancers, then in British India, during 1938 and 1939.

Second World War

East Africa
In September 1939, Messervy was promoted to colonel and became a General Staff Officer Grade 1 of the Indian 5th Infantry Division, which was about to be formed at Secunderabad. In mid-1940, the division was sent to the Sudan to counter the threat from the Italian forces based in Italian East Africa. Messervy was appointed commander of Gazelle Force. Created on 16 October 1940, it was a mobile reconnaissance and strike formation of expanded battalion size created from elements of 5th Indian Division. During the ensuing East African Campaign, Messervy commanded Gazelle Force with notable success, latterly attached to the Indian 4th Infantry Division. By 13 February 1941, the campaign had become static and Messervy's formation was disbanded.

In early March 1941, Messervy was promoted acting brigadier to command the Indian 5th Infantry Division's 9th Infantry Brigade and played a significant role in the third Battle of Keren during the second half of March 1941. His promotion was in part related to his actions during the advance from Kassala through Agordat to the early fighting at Keren during February.

When Major-General Noel Beresford-Peirse, then commander of the Indian 4th Infantry Division, was promoted to command XIII Corps in North Africa Messervy, a brigadier for only six weeks, was appointed to take his place.

Western Desert – North Africa

Messervy took 4th Indian Division to North Africa in April 1941, taking part in Operation Battleaxe in June. During Operation Crusader in November that year, 4th Indian Division, dug in on the Egypt – Libya border, played a key role in repelling Rommel's tanks after they had defeated the British armour at Sidi Rezegh. The division's battle groups took part in the Eighth Army's pursuit when Rommel withdrew from his defensive positions at Gazala in December, ending the year at Benghazi.

In January 1942, Messervy was appointed to replace Herbert Lumsden, the wounded commander of 1st Armoured Division which had recently arrived in the desert. During Rommel's attack from El Agheila in late January 1942, the division was outmatched by the Axis armour and heavily defeated. On Lumsden's return in March 1942, Messervy was moved to command 7th Armoured Division which had lost its commander, Jock Campbell, killed in a motor accident. Messervy was the only British Indian Army officer to command a British division during the Second World War.

Messervy was known as the "Bearded Man" because he tended not to shave in battle. When Division HQ was overrun by the Germans at the start of the Battle of Gazala, he was captured (27 May 1942); but, removing all insignia, managed to bluff the Germans into believing he was a batman and escaped with other members of his staff to rejoin Division HQ the following day.

Messervy knew little about tanks and was not considered a great success commanding armoured divisions by his superiors. He was dismissed from command of 7th Armoured Division by Eighth Army commander Neil Ritchie in late June 1942 following the severe defeat the division had sustained at the Battle of Gazala. He transferred to Cairo as Deputy Chief of General Staff, GHQ Middle East Command 1942 and was sent to India a few months later to raise 43rd Indian Armoured Division as its commander. Originally intended for service in Persia, the division was disbanded in April 1943 when the threat to Persia was removed by the Soviet victory at Stalingrad.

India and Burma

Messervy was made Director of Armoured Fighting Vehicles, General Headquarters, India Command in 1943 where he argued successfully against the then prevailing view that anything other than light tanks could not be used in Burma. This was to have a significant impact in 1944 and 1945 when medium tanks were used to telling effect against the Japanese.

In July 1943, Messervy was appointed GOC of the 7th Indian Infantry Division, in succession to Major-General Thomas Corbett, which was sent to the Arakan in Burma to join XV Corps in September. In the Japanese offensive in February 1944, despite having his headquarters overrun and scattered and his supply lines compromised, Messervy's brigades conducted a successful defence whilst being supplied by air (Battle of the Admin Box). After going on the attack in late February, 7th Indian Division was relieved in mid-March.

In March 1944, Messervy lost two brigades sent to reinforce the hard-pressed defences at Imphal and Kohima in India. By May, the whole division was back in the front line in the Kohima sector, fighting a key five-day battle at the Naga Village. It then advanced towards the Chindwin river, combining with Indian 20th Infantry Division to inflict a heavy defeat on the Japanese at Ukhrul.

In December 1944, Messervy was appointed to command IV Corps, which he led in the 1945 offensive during which, he captured the key communications centre at Meiktila in Burma and advanced to Rangoon between February and April. When Messervy returned from home leave hostilities had ceased. He was made Commander-in-Chief Malaya Command in 1945 after the Japanese surrender.

Pakistan and Kashmir
Close to the Partition of India, Messervy was made General Officer Commanding-in-Chief Northern Command, India from 1946 to 1947. Finally when Pakistan came into being on 15 August 1947, he was appointed as the Commander-in-Chief of the Pakistan Army.

On 20 August, a letter signed by Messervy went out to all the brigade headquarters in northwest Pakistan, attaching plans for a certain Operation Gulmarg. According to the  plan, 20 lashkars of Pashtun tribesmen were to be armed and trained in various brigade locations in northwest Pakistan for an armed invasion of Kashmir. The information leaked out, one of the letters having fallen into the hands of an Indian officer Major Onkar Singh Kalkat. Kalkat was put under house arrest, but he escaped and made his way to India. By the D-day of 22 October, when the attack was launched, Messervy was away in London, leaving General Douglas Gracey, the Chief of  General Staff, as the Acting Commander-in-Chief
On his return, he stopped in Delhi, where Lord Mountbatten made him swear that he had not been asked for, nor had he provided, any help to the tribesmen. But within a week he was found providing arms and ammunition to the Pakistani invading forces. He complained to Governor George Cunningham of the NWFP that Mountbatten had gone over to the side of the "Hindus".

Pakistani officers narrate that both Messervy and Gracey were involved in running the day-to-day operations of Pakistan's Kashmir War. Officers were loaned out for commanding the rebel forces and shown on records as being absent. Nevertheless, Messervy issued a statement on 12 November 1947, denying that any "serving Pakistan Army officers are directing operations in Kashmir", which was cited by Pakistan in the UN Security Council debates as proof of Pakistan's innocence.

Messervy was relieved of his post on 15 February 1948, leading to his retirement in 1948. He was granted the honorary rank of general.
Later, he wrote an influential article on Kashmir in the Asiatic Review, where he alleged that India had planned to militarily intervene in Kashmir several weeks before the event.
He opined that if the pro-India National Conference party was allowed to hold power in Kashmir, India would likely win a plebiscite, but if Pakistan was allowed to hold on to the areas that it had captured, a Pakistan win was 'even more certain'. He had 'few doubts' as to which dominion most people of Kashmir would choose. Historian Gowher Rizvi states that influences of this kind persuaded the Secretary of State for Commonwealth Affairs Philip Noel-Baker to ensure that Pakistan's viewpoint was "not ignored" in the UN Security Council.

Messervy died at home in the small village of Heyshott in the south of England on 2 February 1974.

Family

In 1927 he married Patricia Waldegrave Courtney daughter of Lt Col Edward Arthur Waldegrave Courtney. They had a daughter and two sons.

Career
 Commissioned into the British Indian Army (1913)
 Commissioned into the 9th Hodson's Horse (1914)
Brigade Major – (1928–1932)
 Instructor (GSO2) at Command and Staff College, Quetta (1932–1936)
 Commanding Officer, 13th Duke of Connaught's Own Lancers (1938–1939)
 General Staff Officer 1, Indian 5th Infantry Division, East Africa (1939–1941)
 Commanding Officer Gazelle Force, Sudan and Eritrea (1940–1941)
 Commanding Officer, 9th Indian Brigade, Ethiopia (1941)
 General Officer Commanding, Indian 4th Infantry Division, North Africa (1941–1942)
 General Officer Commanding, 1st Armoured Division, North Africa (1942)
 General Officer Commanding, 7th Armoured Division, North Africa (1942)
 Deputy Chief of the General Staff, HQ Middle East Command (1942)
 General Officer Commanding, Indian 43rd Armoured Division (1942–1943)
 Director Armoured Fighting Vehicles, India (1943)
 General Officer Commanding, Indian 7th Infantry Division, India (1943–1944)
 General Officer Commanding, IV Corps, Burma (1944–1945)
 General Officer Commander-In-Chief, Malaya Command (1945–1946)
 General Officer Commander-In-Chief, Northern Command, India (1946–1947)
 Commander-in-Chief of the Pakistan Army (1947–1948)
 Retired (1948)

Promotions
Second Lieutenant-22 January 1913
Lieutenant – 22 April 1915
Captain – 22 January 1917
Acting Major – 23 November to 27 December 1918
Brevet Major – 1 July 1929
Major – 22 January 1931
Local Lieutenant-Colonel – 1 September 1932
Brevet Lieutenant-Colonel – 1 July 1933
Lieutenant-Colonel – 10 April 1938
Colonel – 19 April 1940
Acting Major-General (Temporary Brigadier) – 14 April 1941
Temporary Major-General – 14 April 1942
Major-General – 17 April 1943
Acting Lieutenant-General – 8 December 1944
Lieutenant-General – 1 June 1945
Acting General – 15 August 1947
Honorary General – 1948

Notes

References

Bibliography
 
 
 
 Maule, Henry (1961). Spearhead General: The Epic Story of General Sir Frank Messervy and his Men in Eritrea, North Africa and Burma.

External links

British Military History Biographies M
Generals of World War II
Indian Army Officers 1939–1945

|-

|-

|-

|-

|-
 

|-
 

|-
 

1893 births
1974 deaths
Indian Army personnel of World War I
Indian Army generals of World War II
Commanders-in-Chief, Pakistan Army
Knights Commander of the Order of the Star of India
Knights Commander of the Order of the British Empire
Companions of the Order of the Bath
Companions of the Distinguished Service Order
Graduates of the Royal Military College, Sandhurst
Graduates of the Staff College, Camberley
Recipients of the Legion of Merit
People of the Indo-Pakistani War of 1947
Jersey people
Academics of the Staff College, Quetta
British expatriates in Pakistan
People educated at Eton College
British Indian Army generals